Richard William Dalgleish (1880 – 16 September 1955) was a New Zealand cricketer who played two matches of first-class cricket for Hawke's Bay in 1907 and 1908.

Dick Dalgleish was born in Scotland, and his family moved to New Zealand in 1893. His father, one of the proprietors of the Timaru Woollen Mills, died in June 1900 after falling from a train near Palmerston.

When the touring Lord Hawke's XI played a South Canterbury XVIII at Timaru in February 1903, Dalgleish took five wickets in each innings for South Canterbury. In February 1904 he took 7 for 34 (including a hat-trick) and 7 for 79 when South Canterbury beat Canterbury by seven wickets at Lancaster Park.

For Hawke's Bay, in his second first-class match, against Wellington in 1907-08, Dalgleish took 3 for 20 and 5 for 49. He later served as secretary and treasurer of the Hawke's Bay Cricket Association, secretary of the Napier Amateur Boxing Association, and was the organising secretary of the New Zealand Golf Championships held in Napier in 1919.

Dalgleish married Nita Kelly in Napier on 23 December 1908. They had one daughter. Nita died in 1948, Dick in 1955.

References

External links
 
 Dick Dalgleish at CricketArchive

1880 births
1955 deaths
People from Galashiels
Hawke's Bay cricketers
Scottish emigrants to New Zealand
New Zealand cricketers
New Zealand sports executives and administrators